Rudolf Höckner (28 July 1864, Wolkenstein - 22 April 1942, Bad Mergentheim) was a German Impressionist landscape and cityscape painter.

Biography 
His parents were landowners and he was born on their estate near Wolkenstein. After the early death of his father in 1872, his family moved to Freiberg then, five years later, to Leipzig. There, he attended St. Thomas School, a liberal arts boarding school founded in the 13th century. He graduated in 1885.

Following that, he initially studied theology at the University of Tübingen, then was briefly enrolled at the University of Leipzig. After deciding on a career in art, he attended the Grand-Ducal Saxon Art School, Weimar, where his primary instructor was Theodor Hagen. He graduated in 1890, with a scholarship that enabled him to take study trips to Southern Germany and Italy.

In 1891, he returned to Weimar, married Brigitte Ebsen, and became a free-lance artist. In 1895, financial difficulties forced him to move to Flensburg where he supplemented his artistic income by working as a sailing correspondent for the Nord-Ostsee-Zeitung. Two years later, he gave that up to make another attempt at being a free-lance artist; holding exhibits in Hamburg and Altona.

In 1915, he and Brigitte finally settled in Wedel, on the Elbe, and remained there until her death in 1941. After his wife's death, he moved to Southern Germany and died in the spa town of Bad Mergentheim.

More than 250 of his paintings are owned by the city of Wedel. Others may be seen at the Hamburger Kunsthalle and the Altonaer Museum.

Selected paintings

References

Further reading 
 Kay Rump, Maike Bruhns (Eds.): Der Neue Rump. Lexikon der Bildenden Künstler Hamburgs, Altonas und der näheren Umgebung. Wachholz, 2005;

External links 

 More works by Höckner @ ArtNet
 "Rudolf Höckner - Meister der Landschaft" @ Stadtansichten von Wedel

1864 births
1942 deaths
19th-century German painters
19th-century German male artists
German landscape painters
German Impressionist painters
People from Erzgebirgskreis
20th-century German painters
20th-century German male artists